Caulfeild is a surname. Notable people with the surname include:

 Barbara A. Caulfield, United States District judge
 Elizabeth Jane Caulfeild (1834–1882), wife of James Caulfeild, 3rd Earl of Charlemont
 Francis Caulfeild, 2nd Earl of Charlemont (1775–1863), Irish peer and politician
 James Caulfeild, 1st Earl of Charlemont (1728–1799), Irish statesman
 James Caulfeild, 3rd Earl of Charlemont  (1820–1892), Irish politician and peer
 James Caulfeild, 8th Viscount Charlemont (1880–1949), Irish peer, elected to the British House of Lords
 James Caulfeild (soldier) (1782–1852), British soldier and politician
 John Caulfeild (1661–1707), Irish soldier and politician
 John Caulfeild (priest) (1738–1816), Anglican priest in Ireland, Archdeacon of Kilmore, father of the soldier James Caulfeild
 Sophia Frances Anne Caulfeild (1824–1911), writer on religion and needlework
 Toby Caulfeild, 1st Baron Caulfeild (1565–1627), soldier and politician
 Toby Caulfeild, 3rd Baron Caulfeild (1621–1642), Anglo-Irish politician
 William Caulfeild (disambiguation), various people

See also 
Caulfield (disambiguation)